Paul West may refer to:

Paul West (writer) (1930–2015), British-born American writer
Paul West (footballer) (born 1970), English footballer
Paul West, pseudonym of Stephen Clarke
Paul West (chef), Australian chef and TV presenter known for River Cottage Australia

See also 
 West (name)